The North American Society for Oceanic History (NASOH) is the national organization in the United States of America for professional historians, underwater archeologists, archivists, librarians, museum specialists and others working in the broad field of maritime history. NASOH is an affiliated organization of the American Historical Association.

NASOH was founded in 1973 to provide a forum for maritime history and remains actively devoted to the study and promotion of maritime history. The society's objectives are to promote the exchange of information among its members and others interested in the history of the seas, lakes, and inland waterways; to call attention to books, articles, and documents pertinent to naval and maritime history; and to work with local, regional, national, international, and government organizations toward the goal of fostering a more general awareness and appreciation for North America's naval and maritime heritage. NASOH also houses the U.S. Commission on Maritime History which is a constituent member of the International Commission for Maritime History.

NASOH's organizational records are deposited in the Joyner Library] at East Carolina University

Annual conferences
Every year NASOH holds an academic conference, where its members present papers on current research in maritime history.  Each year, the conferences are held in a different location. The site is usually at a maritime location, which will allow members to link a broad national and global understanding of maritime history to local and regional maritime activities. Meetings have been held on the West Coast, the Gulf Coast, the Great Lakes, the Mid- and Southern-Atlantic coasts of the United States as well as in Canada and in Bermuda.

Past conference locations
 2020 – Pensacola, Florida     Note: The 2020 conference was postponed on account of the COVID-19 pandemic. 
 2019 – New Bedford, Massachusetts
 2018 – St. Charles, Missouri
 2017 – Charleston, South Carolina
 2016 – Portland, Maine
 2015 – Monterey, California
 2014 – Erie, Pennsylvania
 2013 – Alpena, Michigan
 2012 – Galveston, Texas
 2011 – Norfolk, Virginia
 2010 – Mystic, Connecticut
 2009 – Vallejo, California
 2008 – Pensacola, Florida
 2007 – Kings Point, New York
 2006 – Manitowoc, Wisconsin
 2005 – Savannah, Georgia
 2004 – St. Michaels, Maryland
 2003 – Bath, Maine
 2002 – Honolulu, Hawaii
 2001 – Kingston, Ontario
 2000 – Point Clear, Alabama
 1999 – Lake George, New York
 1998 – San Diego, California
 1997 – Newport, Rhode Island
 1996 – Boston, Massachusetts
 1995 – Wilmington, North Carolina
 1994 – Vancouver, British Columbia
 1993 – Bermuda
 1992 – Washington, D.C.
 1991 – New York City & Fort Schuyler
 1990 – Newport News, Virginia
 1989 – San Francisco, California
 1988 – Woods Hole, Massachusetts
 1987 – Kingston, Ontario
 1986 – Galveston, Texas
 1985 – Salem, Massachusetts
 1984 – Kings Point, New York
 1983 – Mystic, Connecticut
 1982 – Charleston, South Carolina
 1981 – Cleveland, Ohio
 1980 – Halifax, Nova Scotia
 1979 – Newport News, Virginia
 1978 – Annapolis, Maryland
 1977 – Salem, Massachusetts
 1973 – Orono, Maine
 1971 – Orono, Maine

Prizes
The president of NASOH awards on occasion the K. Jack Bauer Award to honor those who have given distinguished service to NASOH and have made life-time contributions to the field of maritime history.

The Charles Dana Gibson Award honors the best article on North American maritime history published in a peer-reviewed journal.

Each year, a panel of selected NASOH members reviews all the books published during the year in the field of maritime history to select the John Lyman Book Awards that are given annually by the society in the following six categories: Canadian naval and maritime history, U.S. naval history, U.S. maritime history, science and technology, reference works and published primary sources, and biography and autobiography.

The society also gives a number of awards to graduate students:

Chad Smith Student Travel Grants are awarded to assist students in funding travel to its annual meeting to deliver a paper at the meeting. The award is named in honor of Philip Chadwick Foster Smith, maritime museum curator, maritime historian, and an early member of NASOH.

Clark G. Reynolds Student Paper Award is provided each year to the author of the best paper by a graduate student delivered at the society's annual conference. Named in honor of Clark G. Reynolds (1939-2005)—naval historian, museum curator, and the first executive officer of NASOH—the prize will consist of assistance in publishing the essay in The Northern Mariner(the journal co-sponsored by NASOH and the Canadian Nautical Research Society), a membership in NASOH, and a handsome plaque.

The James C. Bradford Dissertation Research Fellowship is named in honor of NASOH past-president Dr. James C. Bradford, in recognition of his distinguished contributions to the field of American naval history. Topics in all periods of United States and North American naval history, including strategy, tactics, and operations; institutional development and administration; biography, personnel, and social development; exploration, science, and technology and science; and policy and diplomacy. Applicants must have completed all requirements for the Ph.D. at the time of application and have an approved dissertation proposal on file at their degree-granting institution.

Publications
The society publishes at regular intervals the NASOH Newsletter to inform members about activities within the field of maritime history.

From 2007, NASOH also publishes in association with the Canadian Nautical Research Society the refereed academic journal The Northern Mariner (TNM).

From time to time, NASOH publishes books of collected papers from its annual conferences and NASOH will be publishing a series of handbooks for use in teaching aspects of maritime history.

Presidents of NASOH
 William A. Baker		January 1, 1976 to December 31, 1980
 Timothy J. Runyan	        January 1, 1981 to December 31, 1985
 Dean C. Allard 		January 1, 1986 to December 31, 1989
 Barry M. Gough		January 1, 1990 to December 31, 1991
 William N. Still, Jr.	January 1, 1992 to December 31, 1995
 Briton C. Busch		January 1, 1996 to December 31, 1999
 William S. Dudley 	January 1, 2000 to December 31, 2003
 John Hattendorf 	        January 1, 2004 to December 31, 2007
 James C. Bradford         January 1, 2008 to May 2011
 Warren Riess              May 2011 to May 2015
 Gene A. Smith             May 2015 to May 2019
 Amy Mitchell-Cook         May 2019 to present

See also

 List of history awards

References

External links
The official website of NASOH

Organizations established in 1973
Maritime history of the United States
Naval warfare
History organizations based in the United States
Naval history
Historical societies of the United States

Maritime organizations
1973 establishments in the United States
Maritime history organizations